Accessio is a concept from Roman property law for acquiring ownership of property (the accessory) which is merged, or acceded to, another piece of property (the principal).  Generally, the owner of the principal, whatever it may be, also became the owner of the accessory. Its usage continues in modern times in legal systems around the world incorporating Roman property law, primarily civilian legal systems.

Accessio was not a specific rule of original acquisition of property in itself; instead, it served as the principle underlying the modes of acquisition that had their own particular guidelines for determination of ownership.

Roman law 
The most undisputed kind of accessio arises from the union of a thing with the ground; and when the union between the ground and the thing is complete, the thing belongs to whoever owns the ground. Thus if a someone builds on ground that someone else owns, the building belongs to the owner of the ground, unless it is a building of a moveable nature, as a tent; for the rule of law is superficies solo cedit. A tree belonging to one person, if planted in the ground of another person, belongs to the owner of the ground as soon as it has taken root. The same rule applies to seeds and plants.

If someone wrote on the papyrus (chartulae) or parchment (membranae) of another, the material was considered the principal, and of course the writing belonged to the owner of the paper or parchment. If a person painted a picture on someone else's wood (tabula) or whatever the materials might be, the painting was considered to be the principal (tabula picturae cedit). The principle which determined the acquisition of a new property by accessio was this—the intimate and inseparable union of the accessory with the principal. Accordingly, there might be accessio by pure accident without the intervention of any rational agent. If a piece of land was torn away by a stream from someone's land and attached to the land of another, it became the property of the person to whose land it was attached after it was firmly attached to it, but not before. This should not be confused with the case of alluvion.

The person who lost their property by accessio had as a general rule a right to be indemnified for their loss by the person who acquired the new property. The exceptions were cases of mala fides.

The term accessio is also applied to things which are the products of other things, and not added to them externally as in the case just mentioned. Every accessio of this kind belongs to the owner of the principal thing; the produce of an animal, a field or a tree belong to the owner. In some cases someone might have a right to the produce (fructus) of a thing, though the thing belongs to another (usufructus).

The term accessiones was also applied to those who were sureties or bound for others as fidejussores (confusio).

Modern law 
Accessio has continued relevance in present times, partly due to the adoption of Roman law principles by legal systems across Europe, Africa, Asia and South America, primarily civilian legal systems.

Domestic legal systems 
Legal systems across the modern world continue to employ a form of accessio. A full discussion of each legal system falls outside the scope of this article, but see specifically: South African property law, civilian property law, Scots law. Modern legal systems go further when describing accession, including all circumstances where property has been increased physically but the Roman law concept relates to merger of an accessory and principal alone. Further reading on contemporary usage of accesio in modern states can be found in (L. van Vliet, ‘Accession of Movables to Land’ (2002) 6 Edin LR 67).

See also
Accession (property law)
Quicquid plantatur solo, solo cedit

References

Roman law
Latin legal terminology